Trepobates pictus is a species of water strider in the family Gerridae. It is found in eastern North America from Texas to Florida, Illinois, Maine, and Ontario.

References

Trepobatinae
Articles created by Qbugbot
Insects described in 1847